Siradji Sani (born 4 February 1980 in Maradi) is a former Nigerien football striker who last played for Thermál Veľký Meder. He also holds Slovak citizenship.

External links 
 DAC 1904 Dunajská Streda profile
 Profile at Footgoal.net

References

1980 births
Living people
Association football forwards
Nigerien footballers
Niger international footballers
Nigerien expatriate footballers
FC Luzern players
FK Inter Bratislava players
FK Dubnica players
FK Železiarne Podbrezová players
FC DAC 1904 Dunajská Streda players
Slovak Super Liga players
2. Liga (Slovakia) players
MFK Dolný Kubín players
PŠC Pezinok players
ŠK Blava Jaslovské Bohunice players
OŠK Slovenský Grob players
TJ Rovinka players
FK Slovan Most pri Bratislave players
MŠK - Thermál Veľký Meder players
Expatriate footballers in Belgium
Nigerien expatriate sportspeople in Belgium
Expatriate footballers in Slovakia
Nigerien expatriate sportspeople in Slovakia
People from Maradi Region
R.C.S. Verviétois players
Naturalized citizens of Slovakia
Naturalised association football players